Turkka is a Finnish-language surname. Notable people with this surname include:
Arvi Turkka (1894–1965), Finnish journalist and politician
Jouko Turkka (1942–2016), Finnish theatrical director and controversialist
Rolf Turkka (1915–1989), Finnish sailor
Sirkka Turkka (1939–2021), Finnish poet
Tellu Turkka (born 1969), Finnish fiddler and singer

Finnish-language surnames